Indy Mogul is an Internet-based video webcast geared towards independent filmmakers and creatives. Indy Mogul is hosted on YouTube by Ted Sim and Dave Maze.

Awards
Indy Mogul's The Best Short Films in the World received the 2009 People's Voice Award for the Build your own and DIY by the Webby's in the category of "Variety Show".

The Reel Good Show won Best Variety show at the 2010 Webby Awards.

Relations with the media
Indy Mogul has been featured on a number of online news sites including CNN, NewTeeVee, MediaWeek, Wall Street Journal, featured on G4 and has also won multiple webby awards.

Current and Former Hosts

See also
 Independent films
 Special effects
 Internet forum

References

External links
 Official website

Creative Commons-licensed podcasts
American non-fiction web series
Internet television channels
Video podcasts